Events from the year 1819 in Canada.

Incumbents
Monarch: George III

Federal government
Parliament of Lower Canada: 9th 
Parliament of Upper Canada: 7th

Governors
Governor of the Canadas: Robert Milnes
Governor of New Brunswick: George Stracey Smyth
Governor of Nova Scotia: John Coape Sherbrooke
Commodore-Governor of Newfoundland: Richard Goodwin Keats
Governor of Prince Edward Island: Charles Douglass Smith

Events
 Cape Breton Island is annexed to Nova Scotia.

Births
February 12
 Frederick Carter, Premier of Newfoundland (d.1900)
 Eden Colvile, Governor of Rupert's Land (d.1893)
February 13 — James Cockburn, politician (d.1883)
March 1 — Alexander Melville Bell, educator (d.1905)
April 18 — James Gibb Ross, merchant and politician (d.1888)
August 10 — Patrick Leonard MacDougall, General and author (d.1894)
October 3 — Charles-Joseph Coursol, lawyer, politician and 13th Mayor of Montreal (d.1888)
October 10 — Charles Stanley Monck, 4th Viscount Monck, Governor General (d.1894)

Full date unknown
Louis-Antoine Dessaulles, seigneur, journalist and politician (d.1895)

Deaths
 March – Nonosbawsut, Beothuk (indigenous Canadian) leader

References 

 
Canada
Years of the 19th century in Canada
1819 in North America